Alan L. Isaacman (born July 12, 1942) is an American lawyer primarily famous for serving as attorney for publisher Larry Flynt. His past clients also include Geraldo Rivera, Kathy Griffin, Rock Hudson and CBS, Inc. He lives in Beverly Hills, California.

Education
Isaacman went to Pennsylvania State University (earning a Bachelor of Science in 1964) and Harvard Law School (earning a J.D. in 1967).  In 1968, he was admitted to the California State Bar.  He also served as a Law Clerk to U.S. District Judge Harry Pregerson, Central District, California, from 1969 to 1970.

Professional career
In 1988, he argued the case Hustler Magazine v. Falwell before the Supreme Court of the United States.

In fiction 
Isaacman was played by actor Edward Norton in the 1996 film The People vs. Larry Flynt. Some details events depicted in the film (including being wounded during an assassination attempt on Flynt) actually happened to another Flynt attorney, Gene Reeves, Jr.

References

External links
Isaacman's Bar Record

1942 births
Living people
American civil rights lawyers
California lawyers
People from Harrisburg, Pennsylvania
Pennsylvania State University alumni
Harvard Law School alumni
Activists from California